The Dwarf may refer to:
 The Dwarf (Lagerkvist novel), a 1944 novel by Pär Lagerkvist
 The Dwarf (Cho Se-hui novel), a 1978 novel by Cho Se-hui
 Der Zwerg (The Dwarf), an opera by Alexander von Zemlinsky
 The Man from Another Place from the Twin Peaks series by David Lynch